Kim Jin-kook (born on 14 September 1951) is a former South Korean footballer. While Cha Bum-kun played as a right winger for the South Korea national football team in the 1970s, Kim was in charge of the left wing. He had a small body, but was skilled in changing directions and delivering crosses. Delivered to the target man Jae-han, his cross was one of South Korea's important tactics. He also played for 2. Bundesliga side Darmstadt 98 and Wormatia Worms in the later years of his career.

Honours
ROK Army
Korean Semi-professional League (Autumn): 1974
Korean President's Cup: 1975

Industrial Bank of Korea
Korean Semi-professional League (Autumn): 1975
Korean President's Cup runner-up: 1977

South Korea U20
AFC Youth Championship runner-up: 1971

South Korea
AFC Asian Cup runner-up: 1972

Individual
Korean President's Cup Best Player: 1975
Korean Semi-professional League (Autumn) Best Player: 1975
Korean FA Best XI: 1975, 1976

References

External links
 Kim Jin-kook – National Team Stats at KFA 
 
 Kim Jin-kook at kicker

1951 births
Living people
Association football forwards
South Korean footballers
South Korean expatriate footballers
South Korea international footballers
South Korean football managers
SV Darmstadt 98 players
2. Bundesliga players
Goyang KB Kookmin Bank FC managers
Goyang KB Kookmin Bank FC players
K League 1 players
1972 AFC Asian Cup players
Expatriate footballers in Germany
South Korean expatriate sportspeople in Germany